Naji Heneine (born 22 July 1961) is a Lebanese alpine skier. He competed in two events at the 1980 Winter Olympics.

References

1961 births
Living people
Lebanese male alpine skiers
Olympic alpine skiers of Lebanon
Alpine skiers at the 1980 Winter Olympics
Place of birth missing (living people)